Park Island Ferry Pier is a ferry pier in Park Island, Ma Wan, Tsuen Wan, New Territories, Hong Kong. It is one of the main transport interchange of Park Island, a private housing estate in Ma Wan. It has one ferry route to Central, which is operated by Park Island Transport Company Limited.

Another route to Tsuen Wan Pier (near West Rail Tsuen Wan West station) was discontinued on 13 December 2012 after 10 years of operation.
However, this route was later reinstated, due to Park Island residents' pressure, but with a much reduced service.

References

Piers in Hong Kong
Ma Wan
Victoria Harbour